Awakenings  is a 1973 non-fiction book by Oliver Sacks. It recounts the life histories of those who had been victims of the 1920s encephalitis lethargica epidemic.  Sacks chronicles his efforts in the late 1960s to help these patients at the Beth Abraham Hospital (now Beth Abraham Center for Rehabilitation and Nursing) in the Bronx, New York. The treatment used the new drug L-DOPA.

In 1982, Sacks wrote:

The 1976 edition of the book is dedicated to the memory of Sacks's close friend the poet W. H. Auden, and bears an extract from Auden's 1969 poem The Art of Healing:

Prior to his death in 1973, Auden wrote, "Have read the book and think it a masterpiece". In 1974 the book won the Hawthornden Prize.

In popular culture 
The book inspired a play, two films, a ballet and an opera:
 1974: the documentary film Awakenings, produced by Duncan Dallas for Yorkshire Television as the first episode and pilot of the British television programme Discovery. The documentary won a Red Ribbon at the 1978 American Film Festival and first prize at the 1978 International Rehabilitation Film Festival.
 1982: the play A Kind of Alaska by Harold Pinter, performed as part of a trilogy of Pinter's plays titled Other Places.
 1990: the Oscar-nominated film Awakenings, starring Robert De Niro and Robin Williams.
 2010: the ballet Awakenings, composed by Tobias Picker for the Rambert Dance Company, and premiered by Rambert in Salford, UK.
 2022: the opera Awakenings, also composed by Picker, commissioned by Opera Theatre of Saint Louis, with a libretto by Picker's husband Aryeh Lev Stollman, premiered on 11 June 2022

References

External links
 Other Places – Listed in "Plays" section of haroldpinter.org.  Includes photograph of playbill, production details, and retyped performance review by Alan Jenkins, originally published in The Times Literary Supplement entitled "The Withering of Love", reproduced with permission.

1973 non-fiction books
1990 non-fiction books
Non-fiction books adapted into films
Books by Oliver Sacks
Hawthornden Prize-winning works
Picador (imprint) books
Books about the Bronx